Rayko Ivanov (Yoanov) Zhinzifov or Rajko Žinzifov, (15 February 1839 – 15 February 1877), born Ksenofont Dzindzifi (Ксенофонт Дзиндзифи) was a Bulgarian National Revival poet and translator from Veles in today's North Macedonia, who spent most of his life in the Russian Empire.

Biography
Zhinsifov was born in 1839 into a Graecophile Aromanian family in Veles in the Ottoman Empire, today in North Macedonia. He initially studied Greek in Prilep at his father's school. In 1856, he was already an assistant teacher in Prilep at Dimitar Miladinov's school and a teacher in Kukush (modern Kilkis, Greece) afterwards.

In 1857–1858, Zhinzifov immigrated to Russia with the aid of Miladinov and enrolled at the Chersonesos high school in Odessa (modern Ukraine). Towards the end of 1858 he moved to Moscow, where he graduated from the Faculty of History and Philology at the Moscow University in 1864. Under the strong influence of the Bulgarian national revival ideas as a student he changed his name from his Greek birth name Ksenofont (Xenophontos) to the Bulgarian Rayko, advised by Georgi Rakovski; though, his teacher Miladinov had called him Rayko at school.

In 1863 he had issued his book New Bulgarian Collection including own and translated poems. Zhinzifov lived among the young Bulgarian diaspora in Moscow, along with Lyuben Karavelov, Nesho Bonchev, Konstantin Miladinov, Vasil Popovich, etc., and issued the Brotherly Labour magazine. In the Russian press of the time, Zhinzifov was particularly active in the information of the Russian society about the tough fate of the Bulgarian people under Ottoman rule. He co-operated with the Bulgarian newspapers Danubian Dawn, Macedonia, Liberty, Bulgarian Bee, Age and Time, the magazines Chitalishte, Periodical Magazine, Bulgarian Booklets, etc., publishing articles, poems, Bulgarian folk songs and a single tale. His poetical heritage has led to him been described as a Romantic poet. Among his notable translations was the first Bulgarian translation of Old East Slavic text The Tale of Igor's Campaign. He died in 1877, on his 38th birthday, in Moscow, roughly a year before the liberation of Bulgaria.

In his works, Zhinzifov emphasized the Bulgarian consciousness of the Slavic population of his native Macedonia. In his eyes, "Macedonian" was merely a geographic and ethnographic area of the Bulgarian lands as opposed to a separate ethnic or national term (cf. Guslyar v sobor, Karvava koshulya).

Honour
Rayko Nunatak on Graham Land in Antarctica is named after Rayko Zhinzifov.

Notable works
 Karvava koshulya (Bloody shirt)
 Guslyar v sobor (Harper at a fair)
 Ohrid 
 Zhalba (Lament)
 Galab (Pigeon)
 Vdovitsa (Widow)
 Do balgarskata mayka (To the Bulgarian mother)

References

Sources

External links

 Works by Rayko Zhinzifov at Slovoto 
 Article about Zhinzifov 
 Article about Zhinzifov's life in Russia 

1839 births
1877 deaths
People from Veles, North Macedonia
Bulgarian writers
Bulgarian emigrants to Russia
19th-century Bulgarian people
Aromanian writers
Romantic poets
Aromanians from the Ottoman Empire
Emigrants from the Ottoman Empire to the Russian Empire
Macedonian Bulgarians
19th-century Bulgarian poets
Bulgarian male poets
19th-century male writers
Bulgarian people of Aromanian descent